Iris Hoffmann (born 29 June 1963) is a German politician who served as Member of the European Parliament (MEP) from 2014 until 2019. She is a member of the Social Democratic Party, part of the Party of European Socialists.

Hoffmann served as a Member of the Bundestag from 1998 until 2009.

Education and early career
Hoffmann graduated from the Gotha Finance College in 1990. Prior to entering national politics she worked as a financial administrator, public servant, and local government auditor.

Political career

Career in national politics
In the 1998 elections, Hoffmann became a member of the Bundestag, serving until 2009. Throughout her time in parliament, she was a member of the Budget Committee. From 2002 until 2015, she als served on the Audit Committee.

Since 2001, Hoffmann has been serving as treasurer of the SPD in Mecklenburg-Vorpommern, currently under the leadership of its chairwoman Manuela Schwesig.

Member of the European Parliament
Member, Committee on Budgets (2014-2019)
Member, Delegation to the Euronest Parliamentary Assembly (2014-2019)
Member, Delegation to the EU-Armenia and EU-Azerbaijan Parliamentary Cooperation Committees and the EU-Georgia Parliamentary Association Committee (2014-2019)

References

1963 births
Living people
Female members of the Bundestag
Members of the Bundestag for Mecklenburg-Western Pomerania
People from Rostock
Social Democratic Party of Germany MEPs
MEPs for Germany 2014–2019
21st-century women MEPs for Germany
Members of the Bundestag 2005–2009
Members of the Bundestag 2002–2005
Members of the Bundestag 1998–2002
Members of the Bundestag for the Social Democratic Party of Germany
20th-century German women